Seven is the first live album by New Zealand singer-songwriter Brooke Ligertwood and her seventh solo album overall. It was released on 25 February 2022, via Sparrow Records and Capitol Christian Music Group. The album features a guest appearance by Brandon Lake. The album was recorded on 11 November 2021, at The Belonging Co in Nashville, Tennessee. Ligertwood collaborated with Jason Ingram in handling the production of the album. 

The album has been supported by the release of "A Thousand Hallelujahs" and "Honey in the Rock" as singles. "A Thousand Hallelujahs" peaked at number 44 on the US Hot Christian Songs chart. "Honey in the Rock" peaked at number seven on the Hot Christian Songs chart. "Nineveh" was also released as promotional single.

Seven debuted at number 36 on the New Zealand Top 40 Albums chart, and at number 15 on the Top Christian Albums chart in the United States. Seven received two GMA Dove Award nominations for Worship Album of the Year and Recorded Music Packaging of the Year at the 2022 GMA Dove Awards.

Background
In October 2021, Ligertwood announced that she would be releasing Seven, a live worship album, in 2022. The album recording was held on 11 November 2021, at The Belonging Co, a church in Nashville, Tennessee. Seven marks Ligertwood's first solo live project, and the seventh overall release in her solo career. Her previous solo releases were billed under her maiden name, Brooke Fraser, while concurrently serving as part of Hillsong Worship as a worship leader and songwriter, co-writing critically acclaimed worship songs such as "What a Beautiful Name," and "King of Kings." The album also marks her first solo album of original music since Brutal Romantic (2014) and the first to explore explicitly Christian and biblical themes.

In the processing of creating the album, Brooke Ligertwood co-wrote the songs with her husband and longtime collaborator Scott Ligertwood, Jason Ingram, as well as Steven Furtick and Brandon Lake among others. The album features a band spanning the worship movement, with musicians from Hillsong, Bethel and Vineyard, along with 30 piece choir. Ligertwood has said that Seven cannot be placed within the context of her Brooke Fraser catalog owing to the fact that the collection of songs was intended for the church, thus inspiring the title, and that the album being her seventh solo record was incidental. Ligertwood elaborated that the title of the album was drawn from the bible in Revelation 1, wherein John the Apostle received instruction to write down his vision and send letters to the seven churches, expressing that she also had written down what she had been given and sending it to the church. Ligertwood emphasised that she had no desire to release a worship album under her own name, but ended up doing so "because of how the songs came about and the way I knew it needed to be made and released into the world."

Release and promotion

Singles
"A Thousand Hallelujahs" was released as the lead single of Seven on 14 January 2022, accompanied with its live music video. "A Thousand Hallelujahs" debuted at number 44 on the Hot Christian Songs chart.

"Honey in the Rock" with Brandon Lake was impacted Christian radio stations in the United States on 25 March 2022, as the second single from the album. "Honey in the Rock" peaked at number seven on the Hot Christian Songs chart.

Promotional singles
"Nineveh" was released as the first and only promotional single from the album on 4 February 2022, accompanied with its live music video.

Reception

Critical response

Timothy Yap of JubileeCast wrote a positive review of the album, saying "If you are looking for worship songs that delve deeper than the recycled lyrical tropes and cliches, give this album a go. These songs are creatively and poetically worded and they are thoughtfully and prayerfully executed." In a NewReleaseToday review, Jasmine Patterson commended Ligertwood's effort on the project, saying: "Brooke Ligertwood makes bold choices on this album that are so refreshing. I so appreciate her fearlessness to take risks and lead God’s people where He’s calling us to go through the messages of these songs. Every moment on Seven is holy and precious. This album will lead you into an experience with God in both personal and corporate times of worship." Gerod Bass of Worship Musician magazine wrote a positive review of the album, saying "Brooke Ligertwood writes with depth and forethought and her delivery of these songs are sweet and honest. I would have liked one or two more upbeat tracks, but this is still a really good album." Jonathan Andre in his 365 Days of Inspiring Media review opined that "Seven is one of my favourites of 2022 thus far, and needs to be listened to, at least once, by anyone who’s a fan of Brooke, worship music, or both. Well done Brooke for Seven. Looking forward to what the Lord has in store for this album, in the upcoming weeks and months ahead."

Accolades

Commercial performance
Seven debuted at number 36 on the New Zealand Top 40 Albums chart. In the United States, Seven debuted at number 15 on Top Christian Albums chart dated 12 March 2022.

Track listing

Charts

Release history

References

External links
 

2022 live albums
Brooke Fraser albums